Yuan Wenkang (Mickey) (born 23 July 1980) is a Chinese actor. He first garnered recognition for his acting in 2007, when his performance in Assembly and earned him a Best Newcomer nomination at the 29th Hundred Flowers Awards.

Early life 
On July 23, 1985, Yuan was born in Shanghai, China.

Education 
Yuan graduated from Shanghai Theatre Academy.

Career 
Yuan first came to public attention in 1999 at the age of 19, appearing on Miss News. His first main role in a television drama came with the Stories of Youth.

In 2003, Yuan had a minor role in the wuxia television series Legend of Dagger Li, which starred Vincent Chiao as Li Xunhuan.

Yuan rose to fame after portraying Wang Jincun in Assembly (2007), for which he was nominated for the Best Newcomer at the 29th Hundred Flowers Awards and received Most Popular Actor nomination at the 15th Beijing College Student Film Festival.

In 2008, Yuan starred alongside Chen Zihan in the romantic television series Love Strategy.

Yuan had a small role in Florian Gallenberger's  John Rabe, a 2009 German-Chinese-French biopictorial film starring Ulrich Tukur, Daniel Brühl and Steve Buscemi.

In 2010, Yuan was cast in the film The Double Life, playing the former husband of Zhang Jingchu's character. He appeared as Feng Baohua, the company commander of the 57th Division of the National Revolutionary Army, in the war film Death and Glory in Changde. That same year, he amassed a number of television credits namely romance comedy series Down with Love, shenmo television series Ghost Catcher: Legend of Beauty Zhongkui, and historical romance series  The Legend of Daiyu.

In 2011, Yuan starred in the historical comedy series The Four Brothers of Peking. It is a remake of the 2004 Taiwanese television of the same name.

In 2012, Yuan had a supporting role in the romance film Happiness Me Too. That same year, he also appeared in romance dramas Beijing Love Story and Nos Annees Francaises.

In 2013, Yuan was cast in the lead role of Wan Xiaoda in the Huayi Brothers's production of Tangshan Earthquake.

In 2014, Yuan had a key supporting role in The Golden Era, directed by Ann Hui. The film grossed ¥51.49 million.

Yuan was cast in the historical mystery television series Three Unusual Detectives (2015). He also joined the main cast of historical drama The Imperial Doctress as Yexian, ruler of the Northern Yuan.

In 2016, Yuan played the lead role in the romantic film New York New York. On television in 2016, he played the lead role opposite Zhang Xinyi in the historical romance drama Princess Jieyou, and starred in the spy television series Rookie Agent Rouge.

In 2017, Yuan landed a guest role in wuxia film Brotherhood of Blades II: The Infernal Battlefield and patriotic tribute film The Founding of an Army. He appeared in Wang Jun's palace drama Ruyi's Royal Love in the Palace, based on Wu Xuelan's novel, as Jiang Yubin, an imperial physician in the Qing government. The series was one of the most watched ones in mainland China in when it broadcast in August 2018.

Yuan co-starred with Yao Chen, who portrayed his former wife, in the drama film Lost, Found (2018), which premiered at the 21st Shanghai International Film Festival on 17 June 2018 and was released into theaters on 5 October 2018 by CMC Pictures.  He appeared in the film The Wrath of Silence, in which he played a lawyer.

Filmography

Film

Television series

Awards

References

External links
 

1980 births
21st-century Chinese male actors
Male actors from Shanghai
Living people
Shanghai Theatre Academy alumni
Chinese male film actors
Chinese male television actors